Giovanni Cesare Netti (4 September 1649, in Putignano – Naples, before 31 July 1686) was an Italian composer and maestro di cappella.

Works 
They have been cataloged by Giovanni Tribuzio (siglum TN):

Cantatas 
 TN I.1a: Addio cara libertà
TN I.1b: Addio cara libertà
 TN I.2: L'innamorato Aminta
 TN I.3: Nel bel regno d'amore
 TN I.4: Nella stagione appunto
 TN I.5a: Occhi belli, s'io v'adoro
TN I.5b: Occhi belli s'io v'adoro
 TN I.6: Più non vanti la speranza
 TN I.7: Semiviva e dolente (spurious)
 TN II.1: Seguane pur che può, scoprirmi io voglio

Serenatas 

 TN III.1: Nella notte più fosca
 TN III.2: Risvegliatevi, oh luci mie belle

Antiprologues 
 TN IV.1: Acquaviva laureata
 TN IV.2: Gara degli elementi in dotare li due misti
 TN IV.3: Le perdite di Nereo e Dori al paragone delle glorie

Operas 
 TN V.1a: Adamiro
TN V.2b: Adamiro
 TN V.3: La Filli (La moglie del fratello)

Bibliography 
Dinko Fabris, Netti, Giovanni Cesare, in Dizionario biografico degli italiani, vol. 78, Roma, Istituto dell'Enciclopedia Italiana, 2013.
Giovanni Cesare Netti, Cantate e serenate a una, due voci e basso continuo (Napoli, 1676-1682 ca.), ed. by Giovanni Tribuzio, Perugia, Morlacchi Editore University Press, 2019 .

References 

1649 births
1686 deaths
People from Putignano
17th-century Italian composers